Damien Quinn may refer to:

 Damien Quinn (hurler) (born 1980), Irish hurler
 Damien Quinn (rugby league) (born 1981), rugby league player